Vacations in Acapulco (Spanish:Vacaciones en Acapulco) is a 1961 Mexican comedy film directed by Fernando Cortés and starring Antonio Aguilar, Ariadna Welter and Fernando Casanova.

The film's sets were designed by the art director Roberto Silva. It was shot in Eastmancolor.

Cast
 Antonio Aguilar as Antonio Aguilar  
 Ariadna Welter as Diana  
 Fernando Casanova as Enrique 
 Sonia Furió as Marga del Valle  
 Rafael Bertrand as Mario Martínez  
 Mapita Cortés as Ana María  
 Alfonso Mejía as Lencho  
 Fernando Luján as Pepe  
 Óscar Ortiz de Pinedo as don Joaquín Gómez  
 Polo Ortín as Recien casado 
 Antonio Raxel as Tío James  
 Guillermo Hernández as Chofer de camión 
 Roxana Bellini as Roxana  
 Florencio Castelló as Don Venancio  
 Consuelo Monteagudo as Esposa de Venancio  
 Jorge Alzaga as Gerente hotel  
 Bucky Gutierrez as Maestra de modelos  
 Martha Elena Cervantes as Recien casada 
Pedro de Aguillón as Pápa de niños 
 Antonio Prieto as Antonio Prieto  
 Rosina Navarro as Cantante  
 Socorro Navarro as Cantante 
 Elisa Asperó as Elisa, asistente de Marga  
 Antonio Brillas as Detective  
 Rafael Estrada as Locutor 
 Mario García 'Harapos' as Mesero  
 Emilio Gálvez as Cantante  
 Jesús Gómez as Policía  
 Martha Lipuzcoa 
 Francisco Meneses as Policía  
 Consuelo Oviedo as Chelo Oviedo  
 Guillermo Álvarez Bianchi as Gordo

References

Bibliography 
 Emilio García Riera. Historia documental del cine mexicano: 1958. Ediciones Era, 1975.

External links 
 

1961 films
1961 comedy films
Mexican comedy films
1960s Spanish-language films
Films directed by Fernando Cortés
Films set in Acapulco
1960s Mexican films